Michael Fuchs (June 6, 1972 - March 15, 2011) was an Austrian football player and football manager for FC Gratkorn.

References

1972 births
2011 deaths
Austrian footballers
Austrian football managers

Association footballers not categorized by position